Philip Michael Wilson (born 5 February 1972) is an English former footballer who played as a defender. He played for Hartlepool United.

References 

1972 births
Living people
People from Billingham
Footballers from County Durham
English footballers
Association football defenders
Hartlepool United F.C. players
English Football League players
Footballers from Yorkshire